Kovio is a privately held Silicon Valley technology company.

Kovio may refer to:
Mekeo language
Kunimaipa language